"Feel the Love (Oomachasaooma)" is a song by 10cc released as a second single from the album Windows in the Jungle in 1983. On several releases and editions the song is labeled as "Oomachasaooma (Feel the Love)".

Release and promotion
As the band's previous single, "24 Hours", was released only in UK, "Feel the Love (Oomachasaooma)" became the lead single in other territories. The song was promoted by a music video directed by Godley & Creme thus making the first partial reunion of the original band members since the split in 1976.

The single peaked at #87 band's native UK charts, but fared much better in Europe becoming one of the 10cc's best singles in the Netherlands.

Personnel
Eric Stewart – lead vocals, electric guitar, keyboards, percussion
Graham Gouldman – vocals, bass guitar, rhythm guitar, percussion
Steve Gadd – drums, percussion
Rick Fenn – vocals, lead guitar
Stuart Tosh – vocals
Vic Emerson – organ

Chart performance

Weekly charts

Year-end charts

References

10cc songs
1983 songs
1983 singles
Songs written by Eric Stewart
Songs written by Graham Gouldman
Mercury Records singles